James Edward Harris, 2nd Earl of Malmesbury (19 August 1778 – 10 September 1841) was a British peer, styled Viscount FitzHarris from 1800 to 1820.

Early life
Though the son of a great British statesman, James Harris, 1st Earl of Malmesbury, and the former Harriet Maria Amyand (1761–1830). Among his siblings were the Rev. Hon. Thomas Alfred Harris, Rector of Hartley, Lady Catherine Harris (wife of Gen. Sir John Bell), and Lady Frances Harris (wife of Lt.-Gen. Hon. Sir Galbraith Lowry Cole, second son of William Cole, 1st Earl of Enniskillen).

His paternal grandparents were James Harris of Great Durnford (a grandson of Anthony Ashley-Cooper, 2nd Earl of Shaftesbury) and the former Elizabeth Clarke (daughter and, eventual, heiress of John Clarke, of Sandford). His mother was the second daughter of Sir George Amyand, 1st Baronet and Anna Maria Korteen (a daughter of John Abraham Korteen, of Hamburg, Germany).

Career
Unlike his father, the young James Harris only dabbled in politics. His real interests lay in being a sportsman, and he was known for his meticulous records of what game he had killed and of the local and national British weather. He built up an extensive collection of stuffed game, which was donated to various museums.

A précis writer, Malmesbury served in the Home Office as private secretary to the Secretary of State for Home Affairs from July 1801 to July 1802 under Lord Pelham. He was first returned as a Member of Parliament for Helston in 1802, serving until 1804. He was a Lords Commissioner of the Treasury from May 1804 to February 1806 during the Second Pitt ministry while he represented Horsham as MP. He then was returned for Heytesbury from 1807 to 1812 and Wilton from 1816 to 1820.

From March 1807 to August 1807, he served as Under-Secretary of State for Foreign Affairs under George Canning (while The Duke of Portland was Prime Minister), before becoming Governor of the Isle of Wight, in which role he until his death.

Personal life
On 17 June 1806, he married Harriet Susan Dashwood (1783–1815), a daughter of Theresa Elizabeth March (daughter and co-heiress of John March of Waresley Park) and Francis Bateman Dashwood, of Well Vale, Lincolnshire. Her brother, Francis John Bateman Dashwood, married Georgiana Anne Anderson-Pelham (daughter of Charles Anderson-Pelham, 1st Baron Yarborough). Together, they were the parents of three sons:

 James Howard Harris, 3rd Earl of Malmesbury (1807–1889), who married Lady Corisande Emma Bennet, only daughter of Charles Bennet, 5th Earl of Tankerville in 1830. After her death in 1876, he married Susan Hamiltonm second daughter of John Hamilton, of Fyne Court, in 1880. After his death, she married Maj.-Gen. Sir John Charles Ardagh.
 Hon. Edward Alfred John Harris (1808–1888), an Admiral in the Royal Navy who was MP for Christchurch, Chargé d'Affaires and Consul-General in Denmark, Chargé d'Affaires in Chile, Minister at Berne, Minister at The Hague; he married Emma Wylly Chambers, youngest daughter of Capt. Samuel Chambers, in 1841.
 Hon. Charles Amyand Harris (1813–1874), the Bishop of Gibraltar and Archdeacon of Wiltshire; he married the Hon. Katharine Lucia O'Brien, a sister of Lucius O'Brien, 13th Baron Inchiquin, and youngest daughter of Sir Edward O'Brien, 4th Baronet, in 1837.

His wife died in 1815 and was buried at Salisbury and later at the Priory Church, Christchurch, Hampshire. Lord Malmesbury died on 10 September 1841.

References

External links

|-

1778 births
1841 deaths
2
Fitzharris, James Edward Harris, Viscount
Fitzharris, James Edward Harris, Viscount
Fitzharris, James Edward Harris, Viscount
Fitzharris, James Edward Harris, Viscount
Fitzharris, James Edward Harris, Viscount
UK MPs who inherited peerages
Members of the Parliament of the United Kingdom for constituencies in Cornwall